Winter morning after rain, Gardiner's Creek is a 1886 painting by the Australian artist Tom Roberts.  The painting depicts a man on horseback driving a small group of cattle across a timber trestle bridge over Gardiners Creek, then on the outskirts of Melbourne.

The painting was acquired by the Art Gallery of South Australia in 2011 as a gift from the MJM Carter AO collection to celebrate the gallery's 130th anniversary.

References

External links
Winter morning after rain, Gardiner's Creek – Art Gallery of South Australia

Paintings by Tom Roberts
1885 paintings
Collections of the Art Gallery of South Australia
Bridges in art
Cattle in art